IPAM may refer to:

 Indolepropionamide, a chemical compound 
 Institute for Pure and Applied Mathematics, an American mathematics institute 
 Institute of Public Administration and Management, an institute of the University of Sierra Leone
 IP address management, software for computer network management
 , the Institute for Amazon Environmental Research of Brazil